Porominovo is a village in Kocherinovo Municipality, Kyustendil Province, south-western Bulgaria. As of 2013 it has 453 inhabitants. It is situated at the western foothills of the Rila Mountains on the banks of the Rilska River in the vicinity of the Stob Earth Pyramids.

Citations

References 
 

Villages in Kyustendil Province